Kill the Messenger may refer to:

 Shooting the messenger, a metaphoric phrase used to describe holding to blame the (blameless) bearer of bad news

Film and television
 Kill the Messenger (2006 film), a French documentary film about Sibel Edmonds
 Kill the Messenger (2014 film), an American drama film based on Schou's book
 "Kill the Messenger" (Justified), an episode of the television series Justified
 "Kill the Messenger", an episode of the American TV series Castle
 "Kill the Messenger" , an episode of NCIS
 Chris Rock: Kill the Messenger, a stand-up comedy special by Chris Rock

Literature
 Kill the Messenger (novel), by Tami Hoag
 Kill the Messenger (Schou book), a nonfiction book by Nick Schou about investigative reporter Gary Webb
 Kill the Messenger...Again, a nonfiction book by Bernard Ingham
 Kill the Messenger Who Brings Bad News (also known as Kill the Messenger), a poetry collection by Robert Kelly

Music
 "Kill the Messenger", a song by Jack's Mannequin from Everything in Transit
 "Kill the Messenger", a song by Aesop Rock from Bazooka Tooth